Yaren is a stork known for its friendship with a fisherman living in Eskikaraağaç village of Bursa, Turkey.

Since 2010, the bird leaves Africa each year during its annual migration, flies back in March to the same fisherman in the village on the shore of Uluabat Lake. Yaren, during the 6 months spent in Eskikaraağaç, a member of  European Stork Villages Network, lands on the small boat of Adem Yılmaz every morning; they go fishing together. 

The extraordinary friendship with a human and a stork was first photographed by local photographer Alper Tüydeş in 2016. Since then, Tüydeş tracks the duo and their reunion every year has been followed by bird watchers and social media users. This unusual friendship was filmed as a documentary by Burak Doğansoysal in 2019. The film selected as the winner for "Best Feature Documentary" at the 2020 Prague Film Awards.

A statue of Yaren and the fisherman was erected at the central square of the village. Also, the walls of houses in Eskikaraağaç are adorned with  murals and large photos of Yaren. In 2022, the municipality, willing the promote the publicity of the small village, installed a video camera next to Yaren's nest in the village for broadcasting a livestream from the spot.

Since his 9th arrival in 2020, Yaren brings his partner to the boat. In March 2021, the reunion of Yaren and his partner; and in June 2021 the moments he tries to protect his cubs from the rain was broadcast live.

See also 
Klepetan and Malena
List of individual birds

References

External links 
Live Broadcast from  Stork Yaren's nest
Yaren (2019) Burak Doğansoysal's documentary about Yaren
Storks
Individual birds
Fauna of Turkey
Individual storks